This is a list of horror video games. Horror video games are video games that narratively deal with elements of horror fiction. They comprise a variety of video game genres (e.g. platformer, shooter, adventure).



See also

 Survival horror
 Horror fiction

References

External links 
 

Horror

Video games